James R. Boddie is an electrical engineer noted for his role in creating the AT&T DSP1, a pioneering digital signal processor from Bell Labs.

Boddie was subsequently Bell Labs Fellow and Director of DSP Technology Development for Lucent Technologies, and Executive Director at StarCore LLC. He received the 1988 IEEE Morris N. Liebmann Memorial Award "for contributions to the realization of practical single chip digital signal processors".

References 
 IEEE Morris N. Liebmann Memorial Award Recipients
 Stanzione et al., "Final Report Study Group on Digital Integrated Signal Processors," Bell Labs Internal Memorandum, October 1977.
 Boddie, Daryanani, Eldumiati, Gadenz, Thompson, Walters, Pedersen, "A Digital Signal Processor for Telecommunications Applications," ISSCC Digest of Technical Papers, February 1980, p. 44.
 Chapman, R. C. ed., "Digital Signal Processor," The Bell System Technical Journal, Special Edition, Vol. 60, No. 7, Part 2 (September 1981) pp. 1431–1701.
 Hayes, W.P. et al., "A 32-bit VLSI digital signal processor", IEEE Journal of Solid-State Circuits, Volume: 20 Issue: 5, Oct 1985, pages 998-1004. ISSN 0018-9200.
 Computer History Museum description
 "The Legacy of DSP1", Electronic News, Nov 8, 1999
 Lucent, Motorola Will Create Special Semiconductor Chips
 StarCore design system methodology makes high performance DSP core design possible for multiple process technologies

Year of birth missing (living people)
Living people
American electrical engineers